Johnny Cisneros (born February 5, 1980) is an American mixed martial artist who competes in the welterweight division. A professional competitor since 2010, he has also competed for King of the Cage and Bellator MMA.

Mixed martial arts career

Early career
Cisneros began his professional MMA career in 2010. He compiled an 8–2 record, competing for promotions such as King of the Cage and Gladiator Challenge, before beginning his stint in Bellator MMA.

Bellator MMA
In a Catchweight bout, Cisneros lost to Mikkel Parlo in his promotional debut at Bellator 115 on April 4, 2014, via unanimous decision. Parlo was able to control Cisneros on ground en route to a decision.

In another Catchweight affair and his second bout for the promotion, Cisneros was defeated by Ricky Rainey via first-round TKO on October 3, 2014, at Bellator 127. Rainey landed a knee to the head, hurting Cisneros and knocking him down, before subsequent hammer fists prompted a stoppage by the referee.

Cisneros defeated Gabriel Miglioli via a unanimous verdict, on August 28, 2015, at Bellator 141, thus, recording his first victory inside the promotion.

Cisneros faced Andy Murad at Bellator 160 on August 26, 2016. He lost the fight by unanimous decision.

Cisneros next faced Curtis Millender at Bellator 170 on January 21, 2017. He lost the fight via TKO in the second round.

Cisneros faced Marlen Magee at Bellator 192 on January 20, 2018. He won the fight via submission in the second round.

Cisneros faced Dave Terrel on November 24, 2018 at Golden Boy Promotions: Liddell vs. Ortiz 3. He won the bout via unanimous decision.

Cisneros faced John Mercurio on March 29, 2019 at Bellator 219. He lost the bout via majority decision.

Cisneros faced Mike Jasper on September 28, 2019 at Bellator 228. He won the bout in the second round after Jasper was unable to continue fighting due to an ankle injury.

Cisneros faced Joshua Jones on July 31, 2021 at Bellator 263. He lost the bout via ground and pound in the second round.

Personal life
Heavily-tattooed, Cisneros received his first tattoo at age 16.

Mixed martial arts record

|-
| Loss
| align=center|13–8
|Joshua Jones
|TKO (punches)
|Bellator 263
|
|align=center|2
|align=center|4:15
|Los Angeles, California, United States
|
|-
|Win
|align=center|13–7
|Mike Jasper
|TKO (ankle injury)
|Bellator 228
|
|align=center|2
|align=center|2:48
|Inglewood, California, United States
|Catchweight (175 lb) bout.
|-
| Loss
| align=center|12–7
| John Mercurio
| Decision (majority)
| Bellator 219
| 
| align=center| 3
| align=center| 5:00
| Temecula, California, United States
|Catchweight (175 lb) bout.
|-
| Win
| align=center|12-6
| Dave Terrel
| Decision (unanimous)
| Golden Boy Promotions: Liddell vs. Ortiz 3
| 
| align=center| 3
| align=center| 5:00
| Inglewood, California, United States
| 
|-
| Win
| align=center|11–6
| Marlen Magee
| Submission (rear-naked choke)
| Bellator 192
| 
| align=center| 2
| align=center| 2:28
| Inglewood, California, United States
| 
|-
| Win
| align=center|10–6
| Alexander Moses
| TKO (punches)
| Gladiator Challenge: Summer Slam
| 
| align=center| 3
| align=center| 2:34
| San Jacinto, California, United States
| 
|-
| Loss
| align=center|9–6
| Curtis Millender
| TKO (punches)
| Bellator 170
| 
| align=center| 2
| align=center| 3:48
| Inglewood, California, United States
| 
|-
| Loss
| align=center|9–5
| Andy Murad
| Decision (unanimous)
| Bellator 160
| 
| align=center| 3
| align=center| 5:00
| Anaheim, California, United States
|Catchweight (175 lbs) bout.
|-
|Win
|align=center|9–4
|Gabriel Miglioli
|Decision (unanimous)
|Bellator 141
|
|align=center|3
|align=center|5:00
|Temecula, California, United States
|Welterweight debut.
|-
|Loss
|align=center|8–4
|Ricky Rainey
|TKO (knee and punches)
|Bellator 127
|
|align=center|1
|align=center|3:18
|Temecula, California, United States
|
|-
|Loss
|align=center|8–3
|Mikkel Parlo
|Decision (unanimous)
|Bellator 115
|
|align=center|3
|align=center|5:00
|Reno, Nevada, United States
|
|-
|Win
|align=center|8–2
|Melvin Costa
|Decision (unanimous)
|KOTC: Terrified
|
|align=center|3
|align=center|5:00
|Highland, California, United States
|
|-
|Loss
|align=center|7–2
|Daniel Hernandez
|Submission (armbar)
|KOTC: Devastation
|
|align=center|1
|align=center|2:00
|Highland, California, United States
|
|-
|Loss
|align=center|7–1
|Joshua Aveles
|KO (punch)
|KOTC: Vigilante
|
|align=center|1
|align=center|0:09
|Highland, California, United States
|
|-
|Win
|align=center|7–0
|Brandon Hunt
|Decision (unanimous)
|KOTC: Gun Show
|
|align=center|3
|align=center|5:00
|Highland, California, United States
|
|-
|Win
|align=center|6–0
|Walter Selva
|Decision (unanimous)
|KOTC: Hardcore
|
|align=center|3
|align=center|5:00
|Highland, California, United States
|
|-
|Win
|align=center|5–0
|Ronald LeBreton Jr.
|TKO (slam and punches)
|KOTC: Reckless Abandon
|
|align=center|1
|align=center|2:08
|Highland, California, United States
|
|-
|Win
|align=center|4–0
|James Cooper
|TKO (punches)
|KOTC: Magnaflow
|
|align=center|1
|align=center|0:40
|San Bernardino, California, United States
|
|-
|Win
|align=center|3–0
|Paul Arras
|TKO (punches)
|KOTC: Moral Victory
|
|align=center|1
|align=center|1:42
|San Bernardino, California, United States
|
|-
|Win
|align=center|2–0
|Heath Cassol
|TKO (doctor stoppage)
|Gladiator Challenge: Bad Behavior
|
|align=center|1
|align=center|2:59
|San Jacinto, California, United States
|
|-
|Win
|align=center|1–0
|Nelson Alvarado
|TKO (punches)
|Gladiator Challenge: Vision Quest
|
|align=center|2
|align=center|1:46
|San Jacinto, California, United States
|
|-

References

Living people
1980 births
American male mixed martial artists
Welterweight mixed martial artists
People from Laguna Niguel, California
Mixed martial artists from California